Christopher Hegardt (born January 6, 2002) is an American soccer player who plays as a midfielder for Charlotte FC in Major League Soccer. He played for USL Championship side Tacoma Defiance and the Seattle Sounders FC academy. He was signed by Charlotte FC on January 6, 2022, after the club acquired his rights from Seattle Sounders in exchange for $50,000 of General Allocation Money.

College career

Hegardt played for two seasons with the Georgetown Hoyas, scoring three goals in 31 matches. The Hoyas won the Big East tournament and advanced to the 2021 College Cup semifinals.

Professional career
Hegardt made several appearances for the Tacoma Defiance of the USL Championship while enrolled in the Sounders FC Academy. He was traded in January 2022 to Charlotte FC in exchange for $50,000 of general allocation money. On June 17, 2022, Hegardt made a short-term stay on loan with USL League One side Charlotte Independence.

Personal life

In December 2009, Hegardt was hospitalized after a youth soccer match and diagnosed with cancer following the discovery of a ruptured tumor in his liver. He went through six rounds of chemotherapy and received a liver transplant before returning in 2011 to the San Diego Surf, where Hegardt won a national championship. During his hospitalization, Hegardt received a visit and jersey from then-Chivas USA player Sacha Kljestan. The two were reunited 12 years later in Charlotte FC's home debut against the LA Galaxy, where Hegardt played against Kljestan's Galaxy.

References

External links
 

2002 births
Living people
American soccer players
Association football midfielders
Charlotte FC players
Charlotte Independence players
Georgetown Hoyas men's soccer players
Homegrown Players (MLS)
Major League Soccer players
Soccer players from San Diego
Tacoma Defiance players
USL Championship players
USL League One players